Girl Develop It (GDI) is a nonprofit organization devoted to getting women the materials they need to pursue careers in software development. Founded in 2010 in New York City, GDI provides affordable programs for adult women interested in learning web and software development in a judgment-free environment. GDI's mission is to give women of any income level, nationality, education level, and upbringing an environment in which to learn the skills to build websites and learn code to build programs with hands-on classes. Although at one time active in both the United States and Canada, GDI currently maintains active community chapters exclusively in the United States.

In 2018, responding to allegations of racism that had been leveled towards both staff and chapter leaders within the organization, the majority of active chapter leaders, volunteers, and organizers issued a letter to the board demanding a change in leadership and active transparency from the organization.

History
Girl Develop It was started in 2010 by Vanessa Hurst and Sara Chipps in New York City.  GDI started with just one class that sold out in one day. In 2017, the organization reported chapters in 53 cities in 33 states and districts in the United States and one in Ottawa, Ontario Canada. In January 2019, following controversies surrounding transparency and efficacy of the GDI staff after allegations of racism, former chapter leaders estimated that only three chapters were actively organizing classes. As of July 2019 GDI lists 55,000 members in 60 chapters in the United States and none in other countries. However, only five of these chapters are actively organizing classes and events.

Founders

Vanessa Hurst 
Hurst is a computer programmer, social entrepreneur, teacher, and lifetime girl scout, and a co-founder of Girl Develop It. In 2013 she launched the CodeMontage platform. She is also responsible for founding and running Developers For Good and also NYC-based Network of Technologists. She is currently based in Charlottesville. Hurst served on the board of GDI until the 2018 controversy, at which point she resigned her position on the board.

Controversies 
On August 19, 2018, the leadership of a GDI chapter in Minneapolis were accused of discriminating against a woman of color via a Twitter post. In the post, a community member brought allegations to light that indicated two white GDI chapter leaders in Minneapolis had actively excluded another chapter leader in the Minneapolis chapter who is a woman of color. These actions resulted in her stepping down as a chapter leader. As a result of the lack of acknowledgement of this incident by the GDI Executive Director and board members, another chapter leader decided to step down from her position citing "race and feminism and the way organizations deal with being called out" as one of the reasons for leaving.

On December 3, 2018, further allegations of racism towards women of color came to light, this time from a former GDI HQ employee in an episode of the #causeascene podcast. In the episode, the former employee details many ways in which she experienced racism during her time working with GDI leadership, which ultimately led to her resigning from her position.

On December 7, 2018, various Chapter Leaders across the United States released an open letter to GDI HQ and board, demanding change in leadership due to racism allegations. By December 10, 2018, at least two chapters across the United States decided to go on hiatus in protest.

On December 12, 2018, GDI released an official statement of acknowledgement, outlining policy changes to address issues. Founder Vanessa Hurst stepped down from her position as board chair on December 11, 2018. Executive Director Corinne Warnshuis resigned in April 2019.

Former GDI chapter leaders, instructors, and volunteers created the hashtag #gdistrike to share updates and information about the controversy on Twitter. The organizers have also created a detailed timeline of events that is updated periodically with news about active chapters and leadership changes.

Staff 
Katie Franco was selected as the organization's Executive Director in February 2020, ten months after Warnshuis' resignation.

Bindu Jallabah serves as the GDI Operations Director. Prior to joining GDI, Jallabah won awards for her work developing and executing the operational strategy for the Elwyn Baring Street Center. Bindu is also founder and Board Chair of Karanso Africa.

Board 
As of July 2021, the GDI Executive Board includes the following individuals. (March 2020 board members.)

 Brenda Jin
 Janelle Jolley
 Erynn Petersen
 Kaya Thomas
 Jeseekia Vaughn
 Linnea Spampinato
 Caity Campos
 Rebecca Sadwick Shaddix
 Erkeda DeRouen
 Liliana Post
 Ellen Beardsley

Activities

Chapters 
There are five chapters of GDI, located in Chicago, IL, Washington D.C., Detroit, MI, New York, NY, and San Francisco, CA.

Curriculum 
Girl Develop It (GDI) offers materials on their website that are licensed under a Creative Commons (CC BY-NC-SA 4.0) license and that provide visitors with tools and resources to develop online. The curriculum is hosted and constructed by the GDI community on the web-based version control repository GitHub and presented in a slide format, divided by topic. On the GitHub curriculum page, materials are broken up in a color coded format that shows whether they have been reviewed by other members of the community or if the topics meet the requirements or recommendations of the curriculum. These materials are used for in-person instruction.

As of July 2019 GDI shares ten course curricula through their GitHub repository. Four courses have been updated in 2019, two were last updated in 2018, one was last updated in 2017, and three were last updated in 2016.

Online Learning 
In March 2020, amidst the COVID-19 pandemic, in an email newsletter, GDI announced that all classes would be moved to a virtual platform.

Hackathons 

The organization and local chapters have hosted or participated in hackathons. During the Buffalo chapter's second event in 2016, developers competed to create websites for nonprofit woman- and minority-owned organizations. The organization has also hosted hackathons in Camden, in Wilmington, and in Seattle.

Supporters 
GDI lists numerous companies and organizations on their website that have backed, partnered with, or supported them and their cause.

Named Partners
As of July 2021, GDI does not include any named partners on their website.

References

Educational charities based in the United States
Information technology charities
Youth charities
Organizations for women in science and technology
Computer science education